Lothair the Lame (c. 848 – 865) was a French prince, the third son and fourth child of Charles the Bald and Ermentrude of Orléans. As he was born disabled, his parents sent him away to a monastery early in life. In 861, he became a monk. In his last years he was abbot of Montier-en-Der and Saint-Germain of Auxerre, where he died in 865 at the age of 17 or 18.

References

Sources

External links
 Carolus Calvus Francorum Rex, Patrologia Latina

Carolingian dynasty
840s births
866 deaths
People from Frankfurt
9th-century people from West Francia
Royalty and nobility with disabilities
Sons of emperors
Sons of kings